Jericho  is a hamlet and census-designated place (CDP) in Nassau County, New York, United States, on the North Shore of Long Island, approximately 29 miles (47 km) east of Midtown Manhattan. Its population was 13,567 as of the U.S. 2010 Census.

The area is served by the Jericho Union Free and the Syosset Central School Districts, the boundaries of which differ somewhat from those of the hamlet. The boundaries of the Jericho Post Office vary from both the hamlet and the school district boundaries, including a portion of Jericho in the Westbury zip code and a portion of Syosset in the Jericho zip code.

History
Located mainly in the Town of Oyster Bay with a small part in the Town of North Hempstead, Jericho was part of the Robert Williams Plantation in 1648. The English families who settled in Jericho were, or soon became, Quakers, members of the Society of Friends. Many fled from persecution in England and in the New England Colonies. They sought a peaceful existence as farmers. The name of the area was changed in 1692 from Lusum to Jericho after the town in the Middle East near the Jordan River mentioned in the Bible as part of the Promised Land.

Elias Hicks married Jemima Seaman in 1771 and moved to her family’s farm in Jericho, where he soon became a noted preacher of Quaker doctrine. All the Quakers suffered during the British occupation of Long Island in the Revolutionary War. The practice was to quarter troops in homes of residents, who had to provide room and board for them. The Quakers continued to protest the entire concept of war itself. After the war, peace returned to Jericho, and the neat farms and businesses began to prosper. A Friends Meeting house was built in 1788 in Jericho that is still used in the 21st century. A Quaker school was built in 1793, the Charity Society of Jericho and Westbury in 1794, and slavery was abolished in 1817, with Hicks' help.

A post office was established in 1802, a cider mill in the mid-19th century, the first public elementary school in 1905, known as the Cedar Swamp School. Improvements to infrastructure were made with the founding of the Jericho Water District in 1923. As the population increased, a new elementary school was built in 1953 (Robert Seaman School), and a Volunteer Fire Department established in 1938. The population kept increasing until the last elementary schools in Jericho were built, the George A. Jackson Elementary School in 1957, the now closed Robert Williams School in 1961 and the Cantiague School in 1963.  When the Village of Muttontown was incorporated, the cider mill was within the village limits.  Because most Gold Coast villages wanted to remain business free areas, many do not have their own post offices or ZIP Codes.  Therefore, Jericho Post Office which serves this area of Muttontown is displayed as the official USPS mailing address and leads to the misconception that the cider mill is in Jericho.

After World War II, in the 1950s Phebe Underhill Seaman sold a large piece of her land to real estate developers. This property was developed for new suburban housing. The water tower was erected in 1952. In 1958 the NY Department of Transportation demolished "Old Jericho" to widen Broadway, Routes 106/107, and to put in a cloverleaf access to Jericho Turnpike. New grade schools and a high school were added to the community along with a shopping center, a new post office, new fire department and a public library.

Also in Jericho is the New York Community Bank Theatre, originally established in 1956 as the Westbury Music Fair. The main entrance to SUNY Old Westbury is located in Jericho.

Geography

It has a hot-summer humid continental climate (Dfa) and average monthly temperatures range from 30.9° F in January to 74.7° F in July. The local hardiness zone is 7a.

It is served by the Long Island Expressway and the Long Island Rail Road, via the nearby Westbury, Hicksville, and Syosset train stations.

There is another Jericho in New York, located in the extreme Northeast corner of the state, in the Town of Altona, County of Clinton. It lies primarily along the Rand Hill Road.

Demographics

At the 2000 census there were 13,045 people in 4,545 households, including 3,813 families, in the CDP. The population density was 3,214.1 per square mile (1,240.6/km2). There were 4,600 housing units at an average density of 1,133.4/sq mi (437.5/km2). The racial makeup of the CDP was 86.36% White, 10.69% Asian, 1.42% African American, 0.03% Native American,  0.01% Pacific Islander, 0.51% from other races, and 0.98% from two or more races. Hispanic or Latino of any race were 2.44%.

During the 2010s, Jericho saw a significant influx of residents from China and a large increase in Asian Americans settling in the community, drawn by the strong school district and high quality of life. As a result, the racial makeup of the CDP by 2020 shifted considerably, to 55.6% White, 36.9% Asian, 2% African American, 2.6% from two or more races. Hispanic or Latino of any race made up 2.5% of the population. As of 2020, Asians now make up the majority of students in Jericho Union Free School District.

Of the 4,545 households 38.6% had children under the age of 18 living with them, 74.8% were married couples living together, 7.1% had a female householder with no husband present, and 16.1% were non-families. 13.7% of households were one person and 6.1% were one person aged 65 or older. The average household size was 2.81 and the average family size was 3.08.

The age distribution was 25.3% under the age of 18, 4.6% from 18 to 24, 25.4% from 25 to 44, 28.4% from 45 to 64, and 16.4% 65 or older. The median age was 42 years. For every 100 females, there were 94.3 males. For every 100 females age 18 and over, there were 90.2 males.

The median household income was $101,477 and the median family income  was $109,635. Males had a median income of $79,204 versus $48,431 for females. The per capita income for the CDP was $45,312. About 2.7% of families and 4.7% of the population were below the poverty line, including 4.8% of those under age 18 and 5.2% of those age 65 or over.

Underground Railroad
The building now known as One North was built in 1789 as the home for the prominent Quaker and abolitionist Valentine Hicks, his wife Abigail, and their children. Hicks' father-in-law Elias Hicks "had been the spark that helped convince Quakers and other like-minded people after the Revolutionary War that all men were created equal—including people of color who were enslaved". Valentine Hicks was also an Underground Railroad station master; in his home—a key way station—a removable panel behind an upstairs linen closet (that is still there today) concealed a staircase to the attic where Hicks hid runaways until the coast was clear.  The Town of Oyster Bay designated the site as a historic town landmark in 2012. In 2015 there was a lot of outrage over the preservation of this historic site. Partial demolition of the Maine Maid Inn took place without the approval of the Oyster Bay landmark commission, which outraged many preservationists. [Valentine Hicks (1804) was the great-grandson of Jacob Hicks (1669–1755).  He married Abigail Hicks, daughter of Elias Hicks. see Bliss Forbush, Elias Hicks, Quaker Liberal, p. 289.]

Economy
Aer Lingus, the flag carrier of Ireland, operates its U.S. office in Jericho CDP and in the Town of Oyster Bay. Nathan's Famous is headquartered in Wing A of the second floor of One Jericho Plaza, in Jericho.

Publishers Clearing House moved its headquarters to Jericho in 2017.

Nationwide TFS, the top provider of personal payment solutions for Chapter 13, was founded there in 2011.

Notable people

 Tyler Alvarez, actor
 Madison Beer, singer
 David Carol, photographer
 Harry Chapin, singer/songwriter/storyteller (had a fatal automobile accident in Jericho)
 Jordan Cila (born 1982), Major League Soccer midfielder
 Howard Elkins, murderer of Reyna Marroquín. Her remains were found in a crawlspace at his former home in Jericho.
 Adam Fox (born 1998), professional ice hockey defenseman and Norris Trophy winner for the New York Rangers of the National Hockey League
 Stephanie Klein, writer
 Matt Litwin, musician, founder of band Bulletproof Messenger
 PH-1 (born 1989), rapper 

 Natalie Portman, actress
 Miroslav Šatan, retired professional hockey player
 Jay Sekulow, attorney and presidential advisor
 Adrienne Shelly, actress
 Jamie-Lynn Sigler, who played Meadow Soprano on the HBO series The Sopranos.
 Allan Steele, actor and writer

References

Census-designated places in Nassau County, New York
Census-designated places in New York (state)
Hamlets in Nassau County, New York
Hamlets in New York (state)
Oyster Bay (town), New York